Ivan Argote (born 1983) is a Colombian artist and filmmaker based in Paris. Using humor and staged interventions, his performance pieces and installations challenge dominant political ideologies.

Biography 
Ivan Argote was born in Bogotá, Colombia, in 1983, and was raised in a family of militants who were heavily involved in the armed conflicts during La Violencia. As a result, he became a human rights activist focusing his artwork on social justice issues. Argote's awareness of historical processes and social policies (particularly in Colombia) are what informs his work. At the age of 22, he worked as assistant director at Colombo Films in Bogotá where he learned about filmmaking, video, and photography. Until 2005, Argote had been living in Colombia where he spent time studying Graphic Design at the National University of Colombia. Soon after graduating, he moved to Paris, and made it his home. The move gave Argote the opportunity to meet Emmanuel Perrotin, a French gallery owner, who inspired him to seek a career in the art world. Argote's collaborations with Perrotin started his art career. In 2011, his first collaboration was his first solo exhibition at Galerie Perrotin in Paris called Caliente. Over the years, he has had several show and screenings at Galerie Perrotin, including his 22-minute film As Far As We Could Get (2017) which features people from two antipodes, the town of Palembang in Indonesia and the city of Neiva in Columbia.  The resulting work is a commentary on transnational cultural relations. He works primarily in mediums of sculpture, installations, and videography.

Education 
Argote studied visual arts and design at the National University of Colombia. He later attended the Beaux-Arts de Paris in Paris, and graduated with his MFA in 2009.

Artwork

Strengthlessness, 2014 
In 2014, Argote worked on Strengthlessness, a sculpture created from concrete, wood, and gold leaf. The construction of this sculpture continued his theme of modification of the normal world. It is an obelisk, similar to the one at the Place de la Concorde, but limp, a phallic image turned impotent. In an interview with France 24, Ivan explains the true meaning as "Small fight against images of power."

Barcelona, 2014 
The 5 minute video, Barcelona took place in eponymous Barcelona, Spain, and shows Argote's view on colonization. In the conceptual video, a statue of a missionary priest is depicted relation to an indigenous man and Argote lights the statue on fire.<ref>{{Citation|last=Argote|first=Ivan|title=Barcelona, Iván Argote, 2014, 05'15|date=2015-01-13|url=https://vimeo.com/116669715|access-date=2021-04-20}}</ref>

 Ideologically Yours, 2017 
From 2014-2017, Argote worked on the concrete sculpture which was named Ideologically Yours, one of the many works exhibited at La Biennale Di Venezia. In Ideologically Yours, Argote figuratively and literally brings a shattered world into a new environment by making note of its destroyed features. Using a destroyed black and grey wall, Argote described it as, "piece of a world that was destroyed."

 Select group exhibitions 

 2005 - Photographic 217; Colombia's National University of Colombia, Bogotá, Colombia
2016 - An Idea of Progress, London, England
 2017 - Continua Sphères ENSEMBLE, Le Centquatre-Paris, Paris, France
 2017 - Ideologically Yours on What We Feel, How We Feel It, La Biennale Di Venezia, Venice, Italy
 2018 - The Street. Where the World Is Made, MAXXI, Rome, Italy
2019 - Desert X, Coachella Valley, California

 Select solo exhibitions 

 2011 - Caliente, Galerie Perrotin, Paris, France
2013 - Tompkins, 18th Street Arts Center, Los Angeles, USA
2014 - EspaiDos, Sala Muncunill, Barcelona, Spain
2016 - Kepple, The Standard Hotel, New York, USA
2017 - Somos, Galeria Vermelho, Sao Paulo, Brazil
 2019 - Juntos Together,'' Arizona State University Arizona, USA

Collections 
His work can be found in the collections of major metropolitan museums including the Guggenheim Museum (New York), Centre Pompidou, CNAP - Centre National des Arts Plastiques, and MACBA.

Honors and awards 

 First Prix 2005, National Salon of Young Art, First Prix 2008, Create the "Canal +" ad, Canal, First Prix, Intervenciones TV 
 Prix Sam Art Projects, Politic Science Prize for contemporary art, Ecole de Sciences Politiques, 2011 
 First Prix, Audie talents awards Art contemporain, 2013
 CIFO Cisneros Fontanais Foundation Prize, 2015
 Future Generation Art Prize, PinchukArtCentre, 2017

References

External links 
 Official website

Living people
1983 births
Colombian artists
Colombian film directors
National University of Colombia alumni
Colombian emigrants to France
Colombian sculptors